Autosticha perixantha is a moth in the family Autostichidae. It was described by Edward Meyrick in 1914. It is found in Mozambique.

The wingspan is about 14 mm. The forewings are dark violet fuscous with the costa slenderly orange. The hindwings are dark fuscous.

References

Moths described in 1914
Autosticha
Moths of Africa